Pseudomonas coronafaciens is a Gram-negative bacterium that is pathogenic to several plant species. Following ribotypical analysis several pathovars of P. syringae were incorporated into this species.

Hosts 
 Pseudomonas coronafaciens pv.  is pathogenic on Italian ryegrass (Lolium multiflorum, syn. Festuca perennis).
 Pseudomonas coronafaciens pv.  causes halo blight on oat (Avena sativa).
 Pseudomonas coronafaciens pv.  infects the coffee plant Coffea arabica.
 Pseudomonas coronafaciens pv.  is pathogenic on rice (Oryza sativa).
 Pseudomonas coronafaciens pv.  infects the leek (Allium ampeloprasum var. porrum).
 Pseudomonas coronafaciens pv.  causes bacterial stripe blight on oat (Avena sativa).
 Pseudomonas coronafaciens pv.  causes bacterial leaf streak on wild rice (Zizania aquatica).

Pathogenesis 
P. coronafaciens performs quorum sensing by way of acylhomoserine lactone compounds. Cha et al., 1998 and Dumenyo et al., 1998 isolate and characterize some of these.

References 

Pseudomonadales
Bacterial plant pathogens and diseases
Oats diseases
Coffee diseases
Rice diseases
Root vegetable diseases
Bacteria described in 1920